Kiln Green is a small village in the civil parish of Wargrave in the English county of Berkshire. The village includes Linden Hill to the north and Scarletts to the south. It is the location of Castle Royle Golf Country Club, which includes a gym, a swimming pool and a golf course.

External links

Villages in Berkshire
Borough of Wokingham